Lønnbergbakken are ski jumping hills in Raufoss, Norway.

History
It was opened on 13 February 1921 and owned by Raufoss IL Hopp. It hosted one FIS Ski jumping World Cup event in 1990. Daniel André Tande holds the hill record.

World Cup

Men

Ski jumping venues in Norway
Sport in Norway
Sports venues completed in 1921